Crimond Church is a Christian, Church of Scotland Presbyterian church, located on the east side of the A90 road in the centre of the village of Crimond, Aberdeenshire, Scotland at location . It was built in 1812, to a design by Robert Mitchell, and is a Category A listed building. It is associated with the popular hymn tune "Crimond".

The church celebrated its bicentenary in 2012 with a special service led by The Very Rev. Prof. Alan Main, a former Moderator of the Church of Scotland (1998–99).

Architecture 

The church clock, bearing the inscription "The hour's coming", has an extra minute between the eleven and twelve making for 61 minutes in the hour. The clock was gifted by Dr James Laing from his Haddo Estate in the early 19th century. The clock is now powered by electricity, but the original mechanical movement is displayed in the church in memory of late councillor Norman Cowie OBE who raised the funds for the electrification of the clock. In 1949, when the clock was being repainted, the extra minute was removed, but thus caused such a furore that it was restored.

The church's fish-shaped weather vane was lost for many years but was found in the 1990s and reinstalled at the top of the spire. The vane had previously been the target of vandalism, showing bullet holes from an air rifle.

The pipe organ is a two-manual instrument built by Conacher and Co., one of only two in Scotland (the other is in St Mary's Cathedral, Aberdeen). It was restored in 1985.

The Lord's my Shepherd 
The hymn "The Lord's my Shepherd", a metrical paraphrase of 23rd Psalm, is traditionally sung to the hymn tune .  It is thought that this tune was composed in 1871 by  Jessie Seymour Irvine  (1836–1887), daughter of the minister, Rev. Alexander Irvine (1804–1884). The tune was first published in The Northern Psalter (1872) but was attributed to David Grant. According to some accounts, Grant had only provided the harmonisation and that it was Irvine who wrote the melody, although this claim has been disputed by some scholars. Hymnals now generally now credit the hymn to Irvine.

A set of four etched glass panels inside the church commemorate Jessie Seymour Irvine as the composer. The panels were installed in 2002 in memory of a previous minister, Rev James E Lyall (d.2002) and are illustrated with imagery of Jesus as the Good Shepherd and with musical notation from the first line of the hymn tune. Both Jessie and her father Alexander are buried in the family grave in the churchyard of St Machar's Cathedral in Aberdeen.

Church Ministers 

Rev Dr Alexander Irvine (1855-?1884)
Rev Hamish Lyall (1993–2002)
Rev George Baird (1972–1984)
Rev Spencer (1960s)
Rev John Cardno (1505-)
Rev William Boyd (1799-1839)
Rev John Calder (early 20th century)

References

External links

Crimond Church Profile on the Church of Scotland website

Churches in Aberdeenshire
Category A listed buildings in Aberdeenshire
Listed churches in Scotland
1812 establishments in Scotland